Gesundheit! is a puzzle video game developed by Australian studio Revolutionary Concepts and published by Konami for iOS in 2011 and Android in 2014. The game was removed from the app stores in an unknown year, possibly between 2016-2018.

Gameplay 

In Gesundheit! the player plays as a pig with a cold, being able to shoot snot projectiles out their nose. To beat a level, you need to lure monsters into traps by using your snot as bait, while collecting 3 stars per level that can unlock later levels

Reception 

"Gesundheit! is one of the rare games for iOS that I think everyone should play." 9.5/10 (IGN)

"The sort of experience that shows off the wonderful things people can create for this platform. Don't miss it." (Touch-Arcade)

Pocket Gamer was less glowing in a 2011 review, giving the game a 6 out of 10. Reviewer Chris Schilling wrote "Sadly, after its enjoyable opening stages, the charm gradually fades, replaced by frustration at fiddly controls and exacting challenges."

References

External links
 Revolutionary Concepts Website
 Google Play Store (removed)

2011 video games
Android (operating system) games
IOS games
Konami games
Puzzle video games
Video games about pigs
Video games developed in the United States